The Gurgel Supermini was a city car produced in Brazil by Gurgel between 1992 and 1994.

Compared to its predecessor Gurgel BR-800, the Supermini had a better finish, with improvements to the body and the engine. The engine was a naturally aspirated, water cooled, 792 cc flat-twin. It was fed fuel by a single Brosol H 36 carburetor. An Alfa 1 28 carburetor was optionally available. The most powerful version of the car got larger intake valves, increasing the engine power rating by 4 horsepower - thus offering  at 5500 rpm. The horizontal windows were also replaced by vertical ones. 

The Supermini was very lightweight, weighing only 645 kg (1422 lb). Its fuel tank capacity was 10.6 gallons. The  Supermini had a top speed of 110 km/h (68 mph). Its longitudinal engine was in the front, despite it being rear-wheel drive. The Supermini has a four-speed manual transmission.

Despite its size, the Supermini was a four-seater. It came only in a three-door hatchback version.

Its peak of production was in its first months of 1992, before the factory went into bankruptcy. Gurgel was not able to compete in an open market.

References

External links 
Gurgel Videos
Quatro Rodas magazine photod and article (Portuguese)
Delta photos and text (pt icon)

Supermini
Cars introduced in 1992
1990s cars
City cars